San Francisco Ballet dances each year at the  War Memorial Opera House, San Francisco, and tours; this is the list of ballets with casts for the 2014 season beginning with the gala, Wednesday, January 22, 2014,  The Nutcracker is danced the year before.

Gala

Wednesday, January 22, 2014

notes for gala

Program one, Jan 25 - Feb 2 Full-Length 
 Giselle

Program two, Feb 18 - Mar 1  Mixed program 
 Tears, an Val Caniparoli world premiere
 Borderlands
 From Foreign Lands

Program three, Feb 20 - Mar 2 Mixed program 
 The Kingdom of the Shades from La Bayadère, Act II
 Ghosts
 Firebird

Program four, Mar 11 - Mar 23  Full-Length 
 Cinderella, by Christopher Wheeldon

Program five, Apr 2 - Apr 13 Full length 
 Shostakovich Trilogy West Coast Premiere by Alexei Ratmansky

Program six, Apr 4 - Apr 15 Mixed program 
 Caprice World Premiere by Helgi Tomasson
 Maelstrom
 Possokhov's The Rite of Spring

Program seven, Apr 29 - May 10 Mixed program 
 Hummingbird, world premiere by Liam Scarlett
 The Fifth Season
 Suite en Blanc

Program eight, May 1 - May 11 Mixed program 
 Agon
 Brahms-Schoenberg Quartet
 Glass Pieces

External links 
 

San Francisco Ballet
Lists of ballets by company
Ballet
2014 in San Francisco